Mouchel is a surname, likely of French origin. Notable people with the surname include:

Jean Mouchel (1928–2022), French politician, novelist, and farmer
Louis Gustave Mouchel (1852–1908), French businessman
Marcel Mouchel (1927–2012), French footballer and manager

See also
Mouchel, a former infrastructure and business services company headquartered in Woking, United Kingdom
Mouchet